Qiufu Youdi, born Mo, was the brother and successor of Sutuhu as the chanyu of the Southern Xiongnu. He participated in the expedition against the Northern Xiongnu in 49 AD and became chanyu in 56 AD. Qiufu Youti ruled for only one year before he died and was succeeded by his brother Yifayulüti.

Footnotes

References

Bichurin N.Ya., "Collection of information on peoples in Central Asia in ancient times", vol. 1, Sankt Petersburg, 1851, reprint Moscow-Leningrad, 1950

Taskin B.S., "Materials on Sünnu history", Science, Moscow, 1968, p. 31 (In Russian)

Chanyus